was a Japanese daimyō of the Sengoku period, who was a powerful figure in the north half of Dewa Province. Chikasue was the son of Andō Kiyosue.

Chikasue united Hiyama Ando and Minato Ando family who had been divided. And he obtained some mines, and ruled the Akita port directly. He changed the name of the clan from Andō to Akita, and was extolled as being like the Big Dipper in the northern sky. However, he died of sickness immediately before the unification of the north half of Dewa Province.

He was succeeded by his son Akita Sanesue.

References

1539 births
1587 deaths
Andō clan
Daimyo
People from Akita Prefecture
People from Noshiro, Akita